Herman Kahn (February 15, 1922 – July 7, 1983) was an American physicist and a founding member of the Hudson Institute, regarded as one of the preeminent futurists of the latter part of the twentieth century. He originally came to prominence as a military strategist and systems theorist while employed at the RAND Corporation. He became known for analyzing the likely consequences of nuclear war and recommending ways to improve survivability during the Cold War. Kahn posited the idea of a "winnable" nuclear exchange in his 1960 book On Thermonuclear War for which he is cited as one of the historical inspirations for the title character of Stanley Kubrick's classic black comedy film satire Dr. Strangelove. In his commentary for Fail Safe, director Sidney Lumet remarked that the Professor Groeteschele character is also based on Herman Kahn.
Kahn's theories contributed to the development of the nuclear strategy of the United States.

Background 

Kahn was born in Bayonne, New Jersey, the son of Yetta (née Koslowsky) and Abraham Kahn, a tailor. His parents were Jewish immigrants from Eastern Europe. He was raised in the Bronx, then in Los Angeles following his parents' divorce. Raised Jewish, he later became an atheist. Kahn graduated from Fairfax High School in 1940 and served in the United States Army during the Burma campaign in World War II in a non-combat capacity as a telephone lineman. He received a Bachelor of Science at UCLA and briefly attended CalTech to pursue a doctorate before dropping out with a Master of Science due to financial constraints. He joined the RAND Corporation as a mathematician after being recruited by fellow physicist Samuel Cohen.

Cold War theories 

Kahn's major contributions were the several strategies he developed during the Cold War to contemplate "the unthinkable"namely, nuclear warfareby using applications of game theory. Kahn is often cited (with Pierre Wack) as a father of scenario planning.

Kahn argued for deterrence and believed that if the Soviet Union believed that the United States had a second strike capability then it would offer greater deterrence, which he wrote in his paper titled "The Nature and Feasibility of War and Deterrence".

The bases of his work were systems theory and game theory as applied to economics and military strategy. Kahn argued that for deterrence to succeed, the Soviet Union had to be convinced that the United States had second-strike capability in order to leave the Politburo in no doubt that even a perfectly coordinated massive attack would guarantee a measure of retaliation that would leave them devastated as well:

In 1962, Kahn published a 16-step escalation ladder.  By 1965 he had developed this into a 44-step ladder.

 Ostensible Crisis
 Political, Economic and Diplomatic Gestures
 Solemn and Formal Declarations
 Hardening of Positions – Confrontation of Wills
 Show of Force
 Significant Mobilization
 "Legal" Harassment – Retortions
 Harassing Acts of Violence
 Dramatic Military Confrontations
 Provocative Breaking off of Diplomatic Relations
 Super-Ready Status
 Large Conventional War (or Actions)
 Large Compound Escalation
 Declaration of Limited Conventional War
 Barely Nuclear War
 Nuclear "Ultimatums"
 Limited Evacuations (20%)
 Spectacular Show or Demonstration of Force
 "Justifiable" Counterforce Attack
 "Peaceful" World-Wide Embargo or Blockade
 Local Nuclear War – Exemplary
 Declaration of Limited Nuclear War
 Local Nuclear War – Military
 Unusual, Provocative and Significant Countermeasures
 Evacuation (70%)
 Demonstration Attack on Zone of Interior
 Exemplary Attack on Military
 Exemplary Attacks Against Property
 Exemplary Attacks on Population
 Complete Evacuation (95%)
 Reciprocal Reprisals
 Formal Declaration of "General" War
 Slow-Motion Counter-"Property" War
 Slow-Motion Counterforce War
 Constrained Force-Reduction Salvo
 Constrained Disarming Attack
 Counterforce-with-Avoidance Attack
 Unmodified Counterforce Attack
 Slow-Motion Countercity war
 Countervalue Salvo
 Augmented Disarming Attack
 Civilian Devastation Attack
 Controlled General War
 Spasm/Insensate War

Hudson Institute 

In 1961, Kahn, Max Singer and Oscar Ruebhausen founded the Hudson Institute, a think tank initially located in Croton-on-Hudson, New York, where Kahn was living at the time. He recruited sociologist Daniel Bell, political philosopher Raymond Aron and novelist Ralph Ellison (author of the 1952 classic Invisible Man).

The Year 2000 

In 1967, Herman Kahn and Anthony J. Wiener published The Year 2000: A Framework for Speculation on the Next Thirty-Three Years, which included contributions from staff members of the Hudson Institute and an introduction by Daniel Bell. Table XVIII in the document contains a list called "One Hundred Technical Innovations Very Likely in the Last Third of the Twentieth Century". The first ten predictions were:
 Multiple applications of lasers.
 Extreme high-strength structural materials.
 New or improved superperformance fabrics.
 New or improved materials for equipment and appliances.
 New airborne vehicles (Ground-effect vehicles, giant or supersonic jets, VTOL, STOL).
 Extensive commercial applications of shaped-charge explosives.
 More reliable and longer-range weather forecasting.
 Extensive and/or intensive expansion of tropical agriculture and forestry.
 New sources of power for fixed installations.
 New sources of power for ground transportation.

Later years 

In Kahn's view, capitalism and technology held nearly boundless potential for progress, while the colonization of space lay in the near, not the distant, future. Kahn's 1976 book The Next 200 Years, written with William Brown and Leon Martel, presented an optimistic scenario of economic conditions in the year 2176. He also wrote a number of books extrapolating the future of the American, Japanese and Australian economies and several works on systems theory, including the well-received 1957 monograph Techniques of System Analysis.

During the mid-1970s, when South Korea's GDP per capita was one of the lowest in the world, Kahn predicted that the country would become one of the top 10 most powerful countries in the world by the year 2000.

In his last year, 1983, Kahn wrote approvingly of Ronald Reagan's political agenda in The Coming Boom: Economic, Political, and Social and bluntly derided Jonathan Schell's claims about the long-term effects of nuclear war. On July 7 that year, he died of a stroke, aged 61.

Personal life
Herman Kahn was the son of Abraham Kahn and Yetta Kahn. His wife was Rosalie "Jane" Kahn.  He and Jane had two children, David and Debbie.

Cultural influence 

Along with John von Neumann, Edward Teller and Wernher von Braun, Kahn was, reportedly, an inspiration for the character "Dr. Strangelove" in the eponymous film by Stanley Kubrick released in 1964. After Kubrick read Kahn's book On Thermonuclear War, he began a correspondence with him which led to face-to-face discussions between Kubrick and Kahn. In the film, Dr. Strangelove refers to a report on the Doomsday Machine by the "BLAND Corporation". Kahn gave Kubrick the idea for the "Doomsday Machine", a device which would immediately cause the destruction of the entire planet in the event of a nuclear attack. Both the name and the concept of the weapon are drawn from the text of On Thermonuclear War. Louis Menand observes, "In Kahn’s book, the Doomsday Machine is an example of the sort of deterrent that appeals to the military mind but that is dangerously destabilizing. Since nations are not suicidal, its only use is to threaten."

Publications 

Outside physics and statistics, works written by Kahn include:
 1960. On Thermonuclear War. Princeton University Press.  
 1962. Thinking about the unthinkable. Horizon Press.
 1965. On escalation: metaphors and scenarios. Praeger. 
 1967. The Year 2000: a framework for speculation on the next thirty-three years. MacMillan. . With Anthony Wiener.
 1968. Can we win in Viet Nam? Praeger. Kahn with four other authors: Gastil, Raymond D.; Pfaff, William; Stillman, Edmund; Armbruster, Frank E.
 1970. The emerging Japanese Superstate: challenge and response. Prentice Hall. 
 1971. The Japanese challenge: The success and failure of economic success. Morrow; Andre Deutsch. 
 1972. Things to come: thinking about the seventies and eighties. MacMillan. . With B. Bruce-Briggs.
 1973. Herman Kahnsciousness: the megaton ideas of the one-man think tank. New American Library. Selected and edited by Jerome Agel.
 1974. The future of the corporation. Mason & Lipscomb. 
 1976. The next 200 years: a scenario for America and the world. Morrow. 
 1979. World economic development: 1979 and beyond. William Morrow; Croom Helm. . With Hollender, Jeffrey, and Hollender, John A.
 1981. Will she be right? The future of Australia. University of Queensland Press. . With Thomas Pepper.
 1983. The Coming Boom: economic, political, and social. Simon & Schuster; Hutchinson. 
 1984 Thinking about the unthinkable in the 1980s. New York: Simon and Schuster. 
 The nature and feasibility of war, deterrence, and arms control (Central nuclear war monograph series), (Hudson Institute)
 A slightly optimistic world context for 1975–2000 (Hudson Institute)
 Social limits to growth: "creeping stagnation" vs. "natural and inevitable" (HPS paper)
 A new kind of class struggle in the United States? (Corporate Environment Program. Research memorandum)

Works published by the RAND Corporation involving Kahn:
 The nature and feasibility of war and deterrence, RAND Corporation paper P-1888-RC, 1960
 Some specific suggestions for achieving early non-military defense capabilities and initiating long-range programs, RAND Corporation research memorandum RM-2206-RC, 1958
 (team led by Herman Kahn) Report on a study of Non-Military Defense, RAND Corporation report R-322-RC, 1958
 Herman Kahn and Irwin Mann, War Gaming, RAND Corporation paper P-1167, 1957
 Herman Kahn and Irwin Mann, Ten common pitfalls, RAND research memorandum RM-1937-PR, 1957
 Herman Kahn, Stochastic (Monte Carlo) attenuation analysis, Santa, Monica, Calif., RAND Corp., 1949

See also 
 Nuclear triad

Notes

Further reading 
 Barry Bruce-Briggs, Supergenius: The mega-worlds of Herman Kahn, North American Policy Press
 Samuel T. Cohen, Fuck You Mr. President: Confessions of the Father of the Neutron Bomb", 2006
 Daniel Ellsberg, The Doomsday Machine, Confessions of a Nuclear War Planner, Bloomsbury Press, 2017
 Sharon Ghamari-Tabrizi, The Worlds of Herman Kahn: The Intuitive Science of Thermonuclear War, Harvard University Press,  [reviewed by Christopher Coker in the Times Literary Supplement], nº 5332, June 10, 2005, p. 19.
 Fred Kaplan, The Wizards of Armageddon, Stanford Nuclear Age Series, 
 Kate Lenkowsky, The Herman Kahn Center of the Hudson Institute, Hudson Institute
 Susan Lindee, Science as Comic Metaphysics, Science 309: 383–384, 2005.
 Herbert I. London, foreword by Herman Kahn, Why Are They Lying to Our Children (Against the doomsayer futurists), 
 Louis Menand, Fat Man: Herman Kahn and the Nuclear Age, in The New Yorker, June 27, 2005.
 Claus Pias, "Hermann Kahn – Szenarien für den Kalten Krieg", Zurich: Diaphanes 2009, 
 Innes Thacker, Ideological Control and the Depoliticisation of Language, in Bold, Christine (ed.), Cencrastus No. 2, Spring 1980, pp. 30–33,

External links 

 Essays about and by Herman Kahn
 
 "Herman Kahn's Doomsday Machine" by Andrew Yale Glikman, in "CYB + ORG = (COLD) WAR MACHINE", FrAme, September 26, 1999.
 RAND Corporation unclassified papers by Herman Kahn, 1948–1959
 Hudson Institute unclassified articles and papers by Herman Kahn, 1962–1984

1922 births
1983 deaths
People from Bayonne, New Jersey
Jewish American military personnel
American atheists
Jewish atheists
Futurologists
Political realists
American systems scientists
Jewish systems scientists
RAND Corporation people
People from Chappaqua, New York
People from Croton-on-Hudson, New York
Nuclear strategists
California Institute of Technology alumni
University of California, Los Angeles alumni
Hudson Institute
Scientists from New York (state)
Theoretical historians
Cornucopians